Maquon Township is one of twenty-one townships in Knox County, Illinois, USA.  As of the 2010 census, its population was 556 and it contained 269 housing units.

Geography

Cities, towns, villages
 Maquon (vast majority)

Unincorporated towns
 Rapatee at 
(This list is based on USGS data and may include former settlements.)

Cemeteries
The township contains these three cemeteries: Housh, Ouderkirk and Thurman.

Demographics

School districts
 Farmington Central Community Unit School District 265
 Knoxville Community Unit School District 202
 Spoon River Valley Community Unit School District 4

Political districts
 Illinois's 18th congressional district
 State House District 74
 State Senate District 37

References
 
 United States Census Bureau 2009 TIGER/Line Shapefiles
 United States National Atlas

External links
 City-Data.com
 Illinois State Archives
 Township Officials of Illinois

Townships in Knox County, Illinois
Galesburg, Illinois micropolitan area
Townships in Illinois